Intimate Relations is a 1937 British comedy film directed by Clayton Hutton and starring June Clyde, Garry Marsh and Jack Hobbs. It was made at Highbury Studios.

Cast
 June Clyde as Molly Morell  
 Garry Marsh as George Gommery  
 Jack Hobbs as Freddie Hall  
 Vera Bogetti as Jane Gommery  
 Cynthia Stock as Maggie  
 Moore Marriott as Toomley  
 Arthur Finn as Goldfish  
 Bruce Winston as Stetson  
 Lew Stone and His Band as Themselves

References

Bibliography
 Low, Rachael. Filmmaking in 1930s Britain. George Allen & Unwin, 1985.
 Wood, Linda. British Films, 1927-1939. British Film Institute, 1986.

External links

1937 films
British comedy films
1937 comedy films
Films shot at Highbury Studios
British black-and-white films
1930s English-language films
1930s British films
English-language comedy films